Alex Shearer (born 25 June 1949) is a British novelist and scriptwriter.  He was born in Wick, in the north of Scotland.   Alex Shearer sold his first TV script at the age of 29, after a varied career of some 30 odd jobs.

He wrote for television, film, theatre and radio (including plays and short stories for BBC Radio 4) for 14 years, and then devoted himself to becoming a novelist.

His 2003 novel The Speed of the Dark was shortlisted for the Guardian Children's Fiction Prize.  The Greatest Store in the World was adapted into a television film by the BBC. His novel Bootleg was adapted for a television series by the BBC, and later adapted into manga and anime under its Japanese title Chocolate Underground.

TV work

Spasms (1979) 6 episodes for Thames TV - single play featuring Jonathan Price.  The script was later remade and turned into a series, Chalk and Cheese, with Michael Crawford
Sink or Swim (1979–81) 23 episodes for the BBC - a sitcom featuring Peter Davison and Robert Glenister
Keep It in the Family (1981) 1 episode of Thames TV sitcom
The Climber (1982) 6 episodes for the BBC - featuring Robin Nedwell
The Front Line (1983) 6 episodes for the BBC - featuring Alan Igbon, filmed in St Pauls, Bristol
The Lonely Hearts Kid (1984) 6 episodes for Thames TV - featuring Robert Glenister
The Two of Us (1986) 34 episodes for LWT - featuring Nicholas Lyndhurst and Janet Dibley. Subsequently, re-made in Dutch and German
All at No 20 (1986–87) Various episodes of Thames TV sitcom
Slinger's Day (1986–87) 2 episodes of Thames TV sitcom
No Job for a Lady (1989–92) 18 episodes for Thames TV - featuring Penelope Keith
Close to Home (1990) 1 episode of LWT sitcom
The Gingerbread Girl (1992–93) 6 episodes for Yorkshire TV - featuring Janet Dibley
Law And Disorder (1993–94) 6 episodes for Thames TV - featuring Penelope Keith
Delta Wave (1996) 2-part episode of a children's adventure series  
Wilmot (1999-2000) 13 episodes of children's series
Bootleg (2002) 3-part children's drama for the BBC. BAFTA winner

Radio work

Flying The Flag 1985-1990, a series featuring Dinsdale Landen, 28 episodes. Radio 4.
The Dream Maker 1992 - radio version of stage play.  Also remade in Germany.
The Diabolical Gourmet 2005 – Radio 4 Afternoon play
Play Chopsticks For Me – Radio 4 Short story
Getting A Life Radio 4 short story
 Bonding Radio 4 short story

Film Work

The Greatest Store In The World    1999	(Bafta nomination)
 Play Chopsticks For Me  2000 – Short film
Chocolate Underground 2008/9         Full length animated film version of novel BOOTLEG made by Japanese company MUSE.    	First full length animation to be streamed episodically to mobile phones and internet in 2008, followed by theatrical release.   	Premiered in Tokyo,  January 2009.

Stage Work
The Morning After - Bath Theatre
One More Time   - Chichester and tour of the South West.
Out of the Blue    - Chichester and Edinburgh.
Standing Room Only   Chichester.
The Dream Maker  - The Orchard Theatre Company, Barnstaple, tour of the South West
A Time And A Season   - Theatre Royal, Plymouth
Harry In The Moonlight    – Northcott Theatre, Exeter

Novels
The Dream Maker (1992)
Professor Sniff and the Lost Spring Breezes (1996), Gollancz
Wilmot and Chips (1996), Red Fox
The Winter Brothers and the Missing Snow (1997), Puffin
Dr. Twilite and the Autumn Snooze (1997), Puffin
The Summer Sisters and the Dance Disaster (1997), Puffin
Box 132 (1997), Harper Collins
The Found (2005),  Macmillan
Wilmot and Pops (1998), Hodder
The Greatest Store in the World (1999), Hodder
The Great Blue Yonder (2002), Macmillan
The Stolen (2002), Macmillan
Sea Legs (2003), Hodder
Bootleg (2003), Macmillan
The Crush (2003)
The Speed of the Dark (2004), Macmillan
The Lost (2004), Macmillan
The Fugitives (2004),Haddock
The Great Switcheroonie (2006), Hodder
The Hunted (2005), Macmillan
I Was a Schoolboy Bridegroom (2006),Hodder
Land Lubbers (2007), Hodder
The Invisible Man's Socks (2007), Macmillan
Tins (2007, released in the United States as Canned)
The Cloud Hunters (2012), Hot Key
Sky Run 2013 (Hot Key Books)
This Is The Life 2014 (HarperCollins - Blue Door)  ADULT
The Ministry of Ghosts 2014 (Hot Key Books)
A Message To The Sea 2016 (Piccadilly Press)
A Message To The Sea – published France, Germany and Japan

References

External links
 Official website 

Living people
1949 births
British writers